John Bisley (fl. 1382–1391) was an English politician.

He was a Member (MP) of the Parliament of England for Gloucester in October 1382, February 1383, October 1383 and 1391.

References

Year of birth missing
Year of death missing
People from Gloucester
Members of the Parliament of England (pre-1707) for Gloucester
English MPs October 1382
English MPs February 1383
English MPs October 1383
English MPs 1391